Jessica Rose Pugh (born 17 March 1997) is an English badminton player. She joined the national junior team in 2008, and selected to the senior team in 2015. She had won the mixed doubles bronze medal at the 2015 European Junior Championships in Poland, also helped the team winning the silver medal. She won her first senior international tournament when she was 16 years old in Hungarian International. Pugh was part of the English team that won the mixed team bronze at the 2018 Commonwealth Games in Gold Coast, Australia.

Achievements

European Junior Championships 
Mixed doubles

BWF International Challenge/Series (11 titles, 6 runners-up) 
Women's doubles

Mixed doubles

  BWF International Challenge tournament
  BWF International Series tournament
  BWF Future Series tournament

References

External links 
 
 

1997 births
Living people
People from Telford
Sportspeople from Shropshire
English female badminton players
Badminton players at the 2018 Commonwealth Games
Badminton players at the 2022 Commonwealth Games
Commonwealth Games bronze medallists for England
Commonwealth Games medallists in badminton
Medallists at the 2018 Commonwealth Games